John Mercer Rankin (June 9, 1873 – June 20, 1947) was an American judge, lawyer, and politician.

Born in Fulton County, Illinois, Rankin served in the 6th Illinois Volunteer Infantry during the Spanish–American War. He went to Western Normal School at Bushnell, Illinois. Rankin went Chicago–Kent College of Law and was admitted to the Illinois bar. He practiced law in Chicago, Illinois until 1917 and then moved to Keokuk, Lee County, Iowa in 1917. He continued to practice law in Keokuk. From 1921 to 1927, Rankin served in the Iowa House of Representatives and was a Republican. From 1925 to 1938, Rankin served as Iowa District Court judge for Lee County. Rankin served as Iowa Attorney General from 1940 until his death in 1947. Rankin died of lung cancer at a veterans hospital in Des Moines, Iowa.

Notes

1873 births
1947 deaths
Politicians from Chicago
People from Fulton County, Illinois
People from Keokuk, Iowa
American military personnel of the Spanish–American War
Military personnel from Illinois
Chicago-Kent College of Law alumni
Lawyers from Chicago
Iowa lawyers
Iowa state court judges
Iowa Attorneys General
Republican Party members of the Iowa House of Representatives
Deaths from lung cancer
Deaths from cancer in Iowa